Inner Demons is a 2014 found footage horror film that was directed by Seth Grossman. The movie had its world premiere on 13 June 2014 at the Los Angeles Film Festival and stars Lara Vosburgh as a teenage drug addict whose problems may be a result of demonic possession.

Plot
Carson Morris (Lara Vosburgh) is a former straight-A student who has been using drugs for the past year, having begun shortly after she enrolled in a prestigious Catholic high school. She has agreed, albeit reluctantly, to allow a film crew to monitor her for an Intervention-esque documentary show as she checks into a rehab clinic. Carson is quickly made a target of ridicule by the other patients, as she has been taking drugs because she believes that she has been demonically possessed. Jason (Morgan McClellan), a production assistant for the film crew, is sympathetic and quickly bonds with Carson - even going so far as to believe her claims after her behavior turns increasingly erratic. During all of this Carson also has several displays of supernatural behavior that is captured on camera but only when she is alone. There are suggestions of bringing in an exorcist, however the clinic's physician Dean Pretiss (Richard Wilkinson) thinks that this would be detrimental to Carson's mental well being. When Carson attacks Jason the show's producer Suzanne (Kate Whitney) begins to push Pretiss for an exorcist, only for him to state that he wants to transfer Carson to a mental institution.

The following day Pretiss gives a much calmer Carson a physical exam and discovers that Jason gave her heroin while she was unconscious, as he now fully believes that the drugs will keep the demons at bay. As a result, Carson is expelled from the clinic and her family withdraws their consent to have her filmed. Not deterred, Jason follows Carson home and continually tries to get in touch with her family, but is repeatedly sent away by her parents, Beth and Steve (Colleen McGrann and Christopher Parker). It's only when he investigates her "friends" that he discovers that she was being bullied at her new school by her new acquaintances. They decided to prank her by forcing her to take part in a Satanic ritual, which is when she got possessed. Jason returns to the Morris family home with the rest of the film crew and breaks into the house demanding to see Carson. Her parents are initially hostile, but grow fearful after they hear Carson screaming upstairs. With no other options, Jason tries to exorcise Carson himself but is unsuccessful and the demon causes the house's power to go out. Carson, now fully possessed, then picks off the house's occupants one by one, including her own mother after she tearfully admits that Carson is a victim of physical abuse. Jason tries to appeal to Carson one last time and is seemingly successful. However their joy is short lived, as Carson's father enters the room and shoots Carson in the head and then kills himself, believing that she is still possessed. A horrified Suzanne is then murdered by Jason, who then turns off the camera currently filming, and it is revealed that his eyes are now pure black, as were Carson's earlier in the film.

Cast
Lara Vosburgh as Carson Morris
Morgan McClellan as Jason Hurwitz
Kate Whitney as Suzanne Tully
Brian Flaherty as Tim
Colleen McGrann as Beth Morris
Christopher Parker as Steve Morris
Ashley Sutton as McKee Littlefield
Susan Ateh as Nurse Shanti
Richard Wilkinson as Dr. Dean Pretiss
Sewell Whitney as Reverend Foley
John Cragen as Dr. Krdis
Adrian Gaeta as Eric

Reception
On review aggregator Rotten Tomatoes, the film holds an approval rating of 64% based on 11 reviews, with an average rating of 4.45/10. Much of the film's criticisms stemmed from what the reviewers felt was an overly familiar premise that did not live up to its full potential, and Den of Geek criticized the movie's script as being overly cliché. Variety and We Got This Covered both wrote mixed reviews for Inner Demons, and We Got This Covered stated that "Lara Vosburgh gets the job done for Inner Demons with a few ghoulish scares that are worth the price of admission, but not much else." Fangoria and HorrorNews.net both wrote predominantly favorable reviews for the film, and HorrorNews.net commented that "Character development is conveyed with top notch performances from each of the cast all around."

References

External links
 

2014 films
2014 horror films
Demons in film
Found footage films
Films directed by Seth Grossman
2010s English-language films